Parasiro is a genus of harvestmen belonging to the family Sironidae.

The species of this genus are found in Southern Europe.

Species:

Parasiro coiffaiti 
Parasiro corsicus 
Parasiro minor

References

Harvestmen